Psalm 61 is the 61st psalm of the Book of Psalms, beginning in English in the King James Version: "Hear my cry, O God; attend unto my prayer.". In the slightly different numbering system of the Greek Septuagint version of the Bible and the Latin Vulgate, this psalm is Psalm 60. In Latin, it is known as "Exaudi Deus". The psalm is to be played on a neginah or stringed instrument. The Psalm is attributed to King David. The Jerusalem Bible calls it a "prayer of an exile".

The psalm forms a regular part of Jewish, Catholic, Lutheran, Anglican and other Protestant liturgies. It has been set to music.

Text

King James Version 
 Hear my cry, O God; attend unto my prayer.
 From the end of the earth will I cry unto thee, when my heart is overwhelmed: lead me to the rock that is higher than I.
 For thou hast been a shelter for me, and a strong tower from the enemy.
 I will abide in thy tabernacle for ever: I will trust in the covert of thy wings. Selah.
 For thou, O God, hast heard my vows: thou hast given me the heritage of those that fear thy name.
 Thou wilt prolong the king's life: and his years as many generations.
 He shall abide before God for ever: O prepare mercy and truth, which may preserve him.
 So will I sing praise unto thy name for ever, that I may daily perform my vows.

Prayer of an exile 
The Jerusalem Bible notes that verses 1-5 of this psalm are the lament of an exiled Levite, and verses 6-7 are a prayer for the king.

Uses

Judaism
This psalm is recited on Hoshana Rabbah.
Verse 5 is found in the repetition of the Amidah during Rosh Hashanah.

Catholic Church
During the Middle Ages monasteries used this psalm traditionally recited or sung during the celebration of the matins of Wednesday, according to the Rule of Saint Benedict established in 530.

In the current Liturgy of the Hours, Psalm 61 is sung or recited at the midday office on the Saturday of the second week of the four weekly cycle of liturgical prayers.

Book of Common Prayer
In the Church of England's Book of Common Prayer, this psalm is appointed to be read on the evening of the 11th day of the month.

Musical settings
Part of the text of Psalm 61, verses 6 to 8, have been adapted as a coronation anthem for English kings, O Lord, grant the King a long life. Early settings were written by Thomas Weelkes and Thomas Tomkins, and was sung during the procession of the monarch between Westminster Hall and Westminster Abbey. It was last used in that way at the coronation of George IV in 1821 to a setting by William Child; neither the procession nor the anthem was included in later British coronations.

Heinrich Schütz set the psalm in a metred version in German, "Gott, mein Geschrei erhöre", SWV 158, as part of the Becker Psalter, first published in 1628. Antonín Dvořák set verses 1, 3, and 4 to music (together with part of Psalm 63) in No. 6 of his Biblical Songs (1894).

Alan Hovhaness set verses 1 through 4 in his 1951 work From the End of the Earth.

References

External links 

 
 
  in Hebrew and English - Mechon-mamre
 Text of Psalm 61 according to the 1928 Psalter
 For the leader; with stringed instruments. Of David. Hear my cry, O God, listen to my prayer! text and footnotes, usccb.org United States Conference of Catholic Bishops
 Psalm 61 – Hope and Help When My Heart is Overwhelmed text and detailed commentary, enduringword.com
 Psalm 61:1 introduction and text, biblestudytools.com
 Psalm 61 / Refrain: You are my refuge, O God, a strong tower against the enemy. Church of England
 Psalm 61 at biblegateway.com
 Hymns for Psalm 61 hymnary.org

061
Works attributed to David